West Somerset was a local government district in the English county of Somerset. It merged with Taunton Deane to form Somerset West and Taunton on 1 April 2019.

Monuments

|}

See also 
 Scheduled monuments in West Somerset – overview of scheduled monuments
 Scheduled monuments in West Somerset (H–Z) – list of scheduled monuments
 Scheduled monuments in Taunton Deane – overview and list of scheduled monuments

Notes

References 

List
History of Somerset
List
Somerset, West
Lists of buildings and structures in Somerset